The Senova D20 is a subcompact sedan and hatchback produced by BAIC under the Senova brand. Originally called the Beijing Auto E-Series when launched in 2012, the subcompact hatchback and sedan was renamed to Senova D20 in 2014 with the launch of the Senova brand.

History
The original Beijing Auto E-series was listed and priced on the Chinese market with prices starting at 53,800 yuan and ending at 86,800 yuan. The E-series is available with two engines sourced from Mitsubishi, with the E150 model being powered by a 1.5 liter engine and the E130 model being powered by a 1.3 liter engine.

On the 2014 Guangzhou Auto Show in China, the facelifted Beijing Auto E-Series was introduced as the Senova D20 and has been moved under the later-established Senova sub-brand. The original Beijing Auto E-Series has a price range of 58,800 yuan to 74,800 yuan. Engines: 99 hp 1.3 and a 113 hp 1.5, mated to a five-speed manual or a five-speed automatic. The E-Series is based on the same platform as the 2004 Smart Forfour/Mitsubishi Colt and styling-wise heavily inspired by the first generation Mercedes-Benz B-Class.

Beijing Auto E150EV
The E150EV is the electric vehicle version of the Beijing Auto E-series. The E150 is powered by a 16kW electric motor made by the Beijing Electric Power Corporation with a top speed of 120 km/h, a range of 150 km, and charging takes 6-8 hours.

References

External links 

D20
Subcompact cars
Hatchbacks
Sedans
Front-wheel-drive vehicles
Cars introduced in 2012
Cars of China